Robin tom Rink,  (born 19 January 1982) is a German singer-songwriter and poet from Münster.

History 
In 2007 he moved from Berlin to Paris where he wrote his first album The Dilettante.
He toured and played concerts with Heather Nova, Scott Matthew, Chris Wollard of Hot Water Music, Drag the River, Eleni Mandell and Nigel Harrison of Blondie.
In 2010 he was invited to the Eurosonic Noorderslag.

Robin tom Rink also writes songs and lyrics for other bands. He wrote the lyrics for the album Planet, Planet. by the band Elyjah; The cover artwork by 
Zwölf agency won the Gold award at the European Design Award 2010 and the Silver Cube at the 89th Art Directors Club Awards New York.

The album The Small Hours was released in 2017. The Rolling Stone wrote about "songs of graceful peace".

In 2019 he was invited by the Cité internationale des arts to play in Paris.

His poems and lyrics were released by Edition Yara from Vienna.

He is married and lives in Cologne.

Discography
 The Dilettante (2009, Cargo Records)
 Planet Planet (2009, Cargo Records) with Elyjah
 Thoughts from the Lighthouse (2010, Cargo Records)
 The Shorelines-Live (2012)
 The Small Hours (2017, Indigo Records)

Books
 Lyrics Edition Yara; Vienna
 Waldmeder-Ein Gedicht Edition Yara; Vienna

Compilations 
 New Noises 95 (Rolling Stone)
 All Areas 105 (Visions Magazine)

References

External links
 
 http://www.edition-yara.at
 http://www.cargo-records.de/de/item/37123/katalog_art.75.html
 http://www.rollingstone.de/das-archiv/article188015/robin-tom-rink-the-dilettante-viva-hate-cargo.html
 http://www.vivahaterecords.com/wp/?cat=3
 http://www.motor.de/elyjah-peng/
 http://www.iprecom.nl/noorderslag/archief/i.cgi?country=DE&next=50&next=100
 http://www.indigo.de/unser_programm/titel/13550/

1982 births
Living people
German male musicians